Elton Hart Hobson (November 10, 1924 - August 15, 2020) was a Canadian football player who played for the Winnipeg Blue Bombers.

References

1924 births
2020 deaths
Canadian football quarterbacks
Winnipeg Blue Bombers players
Canadian football running backs